The Sunderland Stars were a motorcycle speedway team who raced at the Sunderland Greyhound Stadium from  1971 until 1974 in the Britrish League Division Two when Len Silver acted as promoter on behalf of Allied Presentations Ltd.

History
Speedway was operational at the venue for part of one season when eight meetings were staged in 1964 under the "Saints" nickname. The Saints introduced Aussies Jim Airey and Gordon Guasco to British Speedway during 1964.

The inaugural season of league speedway took place during the 1971 British League Division Two season but unfortunately the team finished 17th out of 17. This was followed by two seasons with 12th and 11th place finishes.

In 1974, the club came under new ownership and were nicknamed the "Gladiators". It was also their final season before closure.

Season summary

Notable riders
 Jim Airey
 George Barclay
 Russ Dent
 Gordon Guasco
 Brian Havelock
 Vic Harding
 Jack Millen

References

Defunct British speedway teams